Stadionul Orășenesc is a multi-purpose stadium, frequently used for football. It is located in Mioveni, Romania. It is the home ground of local club CS Mioveni, which as of 2022 plays in the Romanian Liga I.

References

Football venues in Romania
Multi-purpose stadiums in Romania
CS Mioveni